The Museum of Carpet is a textile museum in the town of Kidderminster in Worcestershire, England.

History 
A Carpet Museum Trust was founded in 1981, with the main aim being to open a public museum. The museum would be for the exhibition of items of local historical and educational interest which is connected to the manufacture of carpets or any other similar textiles. When the industry was shrinking, this enabled the Carpet Museum Trust to collect machinery, artefacts, archives  and libraries from several firms in Kidderminster.

On 20 October 2012, the Museum of Carpet was opened to the public after the museum was formally opened by the Carpet Museum Trust patron Lord Cobham.

Between 11 July and 28 September 2019 the Woven Forms: Breaking the boundaries' exhibition, featuring the work of Jan Bowman which was previously shown at the Saatchi Gallery.

References 

Textile museums
Buildings and structures in Kidderminster
Museums in Worcestershire